László Branikovits (18 December 1949 – 16 October 2020) was a Hungarian footballer. He competed in the men's tournament at the 1972 Summer Olympics.

Branikovits died on 16 October 2020 at the age of 70.

References

External links
 

1949 births
2020 deaths
Hungarian footballers
Hungary international footballers
Olympic footballers of Hungary
Footballers at the 1972 Summer Olympics
Footballers from Budapest
Association football forwards
Olympic silver medalists for Hungary
Olympic medalists in football
Medalists at the 1972 Summer Olympics
Ferencvárosi TC footballers
Csepel SC footballers